Labyrinthitis (stylized in all caps) is the thirteenth studio album by Canadian indie rock band Destroyer, released on March 25, 2022, by Merge Records and Bella Union.

Background and recording 
Labyrinthitis was created by frontman Dan Bejar with longtime collaborator and producer John Collins and the Destroyer band. The album was primarily written in 2020 and recorded in winter/spring 2021. Bejar worked remotely from his home in Vancouver and Collins on Galiano Island, with the two sending ideas to each other from their respective locations.

Release 
The album was announced on January 11, 2022, and "Tintoretto, It's for You" was released as its first single with an accompanying music video directed by David Galloway. "Eat the Wine, Drink the Bread" was released as the album's second single on February 14, 2022. "June" was released as the album's third single on March 9, 2022, accompanied by a music video co-directed by Galloway and Bejar.

Critical reception 

Fred Thomas, in his review for AllMusic, called the album "another exciting step forward in Destroyer's never-ending evolution, delivering pleasant confusion and unexpected choices along with the kind of fractured but magical songwriting of which only Bejar is capable." In a review for Pitchfork, Andy Cush praised the album's complexity.

The album was shortlisted for the 2022 Polaris Music Prize.

Year-end lists

Track listing

Personnel 
Destroyer
 Dan Bejar – vocals, synthesizer, guitar
 John Collins – bass, synthesizer, guitar, drum programming, production, mixing
 Ted Bois – piano, synthesizer, photography
 Nicolas Bragg – guitar
 David Carswell – guitar
 JP Carter – trumpet
 Joshua Wells – drums, percussion

Additional personnel
 Joe LaPorta – mastering
 Sydney Hermant – cover painting
 Daniel Murphy – design

Charts

References 

2022 albums
Destroyer (band) albums
Merge Records albums
Bella Union albums
Albums produced by John Collins (Canadian musician)